The 2023 European Mixed Team Badminton Championships was held in Aire-sur-la-Lys, France, between 14 and 18 February 2023 and organised by Badminton Europe and French Badminton Federation. The host location was announced in December 2021 by Badminton Europe. These championships also act as the European qualification event for 2023 Sudirman Cup.

Qualification

Direct qualifiers
 (Host country)
 (Reigning champion)
 (Highest ranked team)

Qualification stage 

The 2023 European Mixed Team Championships Qualification will be held from 15-18 December 2022. This time 26 countries are participating and will be divided into five qualification groups which will be played in five different locations. The winner of each group will qualify for the championships.

Group stage

Group A

Denmark vs Ukraine

England vs Scotland

Denmark vs Scotland

England vs Ukraine

Denmark vs England

Scotland vs Ukraine

Group B

Germany vs Bulgaria

France vs Netherlands

Germany vs Netherlands

France vs Bulgaria

Germany vs France

Netherlands vs Bulgaria

Knockout stage

Semi-finals

Final

Final ranking

References

External links
 2023 European Mixed Team Championships
 Qualification Group 1 Results
 Qualification Group 2 Results
 Qualification Group 3 Results
 Qualification Group 4 Results
 Qualification Group 5 Results

2023
European Mixed Team Badminton Championships
2023 European Mixed Team Badminton Championships
European Mixed Team Badminton Championships
European Mixed Team Badminton Championships